Benjamin Joseph Kucera (born August 10, 1994) is an American soccer player who plays as a defender, most recently for USL Championship club Birmingham Legion.

Career

College
Kucera began playing college soccer at Creighton University, but redshirted his first year and transferred to the University of Santa Clara in 2014.

Professional
In 2016, Kucera signed for Czech First League side Slovácko. However, he only appeared for the club's B team who competed in the Moravian–Silesian Football League.

Kucera returned to the United States in 2018, playing with USL PDL side Birmingham Hammers.

On February 27, 2019, Kucera signed for USL Championship side Birmingham Legion ahead of their inaugural season. He made his professional debut on August 17, 2019, appearing as an injury time substitute in a 1-0 win over Memphis 901.

References

External links
 Creighton profile
 Santa Clara profile
 Legion FC profile
 

Living people
1994 births
American soccer players
Soccer players from Illinois
People from Berwyn, Illinois
Association football defenders
Creighton Bluejays men's soccer players
Santa Clara Broncos men's soccer players
1. FC Slovácko players
Birmingham Legion FC players
USL League Two players
USL Championship players
American expatriate soccer players
Expatriate footballers in the Czech Republic
American expatriate sportspeople in the Czech Republic